Unauthorized Living is a Spanish-language television series created by Aitor Gabilondo and starring José Coronado, Álex González, Claudia Traisac. The plot revolves around Nemo Bandeira (Coronado) who has a businessman facade, but is really a drug lord. When Nemo is diagnosed with Alzheimer's disease around his sixtieth birthday, he keeps it a secret and starts to think about who might be his successor.

It was released on September 24, 2018 on Telecinco and is being streamed on Netflix in February 2020.

Plot

The plot of ‘Unauthorized Living’/ ‘Vivir sin Permiso’ follows the story of Nemo Bandeira, a drug lord with a clean businessman facade, who is diagnosed with Alzheimer's disease. Although he tries to keep the news away from his family it becomes difficult while he tries to assess who his successor might be. Season 1 of the show revolves around Bandeira’s challenges within his family and his business network. Season 2 will see how his second-in-command tries to steal the business empire from its rightful heir, resulting in betrayal, violence and mayhem in Bandeira’s life.

Cast

Release
Unauthorized Living was released on September 24, 2018 on Telecinco. The series finale aired on March 16, 2020.

Awards and nominations 

|-
| align = "center" rowspan = "3" | 2018 || rowspan = "3" | 6th  || colspan = "2" | Best Drama Series ||  || rowspan = "3" | 
|-
| Best Drama Actor || José Coronado || 
|-
| Best Screenplay ||  Aitor Gabilondo, Joan Barbero, Antonio Hernández Centeno, Darío Madrona, Guadalupe Rilova, Olga Salvador and Mauricio Romero || 
|-
| align = "center" | 2020 || 29th Actors and Actresses Union Awards || Best TV Actress in a Minor Performance || Leonor Watling ||  || 
|}

Remake 
In March 2022, media reported the development of an Italian remake by Canale 5 directed and starred by Claudio Amendola, Il patriarca.

References

External links
 
 
 

2010s Spanish drama television series
Spanish-language television shows
2018 Spanish television series debuts
Telecinco network series
Television shows set in Galicia (Spain)
2020 Spanish television series endings
2020s Spanish drama television series